Jiana is a commune located in Mehedinți County, Oltenia, Romania. It is composed of five villages: Cioroboreni, Dănceu, Jiana, Jiana Mare and Jiana Veche.

References

Communes in Mehedinți County
Localities in Oltenia